is a private junior college in Yamaguchi, Yamaguchi, Japan, established in 1968.

Department 
 Department of Nursery
 Child education course
 Care welfare course
 Department of Arts

External links
 Official website 

Educational institutions established in 1968
Private universities and colleges in Japan
Universities and colleges in Yamaguchi Prefecture
Japanese junior colleges
Yamaguchi (city)
1968 establishments in Japan